Granulomelon adcockianum is a species of air-breathing land snail, a terrestrial pulmonate gastropod mollusk in the family Camaenidae.

Distribution
This species is endemic to Australia.

References

External links

  2006 IUCN Red List of Threatened Species.   Downloaded on 7 August 2007.
 Tate R. (1894). Brief diagnoses of Mollusca from Central Australia. Transactions of the Royal Society of South Australia. 18: 191-194
 Criscione F. & Köhler F. (2016). Snails in the desert: Assessing the mitochondrial and morphological diversity and the influence of aestivation behavior on lineage differentiation in the Australian endemic Granulomelon Iredale, 1933 (Stylommatophora: Camaenidae). Molecular Phylogenetics and Evolution. 94: 101-112.

Gastropods of Australia
adcockianum
Gastropods described in 1894
Taxonomy articles created by Polbot
Taxobox binomials not recognized by IUCN